Africanization or Africanisation (lit., making something African) has been applied in various contexts, notably in geographic and personal naming and in the composition of the civil service via processes such as indigenization.

Africanization of names

Africanization has referred to the modification of placenames and personal names to reflect an "African" identity. In some cases, changes are not only of transliteration but of the European name.

In many cases during the colonial period, African placenames were Anglicized or Francized.

Place names

Country names
Various African countries have undergone name changes during the previous century as the result of consolidations and secessions, territories gaining sovereignty, and regime changes.

Other place names

Fernando Po island changed to Bioko Island
Léopoldville changed to Kinshasa
Salisbury changed to Harare
Lourenço Marques changed to Maputo
Nova Lisboa changed to Huambo
Fort Lamy changed to N'Djaména
Tananarive changed to Antananarivo
Bathurst changed to Banjul
Santa Isabel/Port Clarence changed to Malabo
Élisabethville changed to Lubumbashi
Stanleyville changed to Kisangani
Luluabourg changed to Kananga
Ponthierville changed to Ubundu
Novo Redondo changed to Sumbe
Moçâmedes changed to Namibe, but changed back to Moçâmedes in 2016
Abercorn changed to Mbala
Broken Hill changed to Kabwe
Fort Jameson changed to Chipata
Hartley changed to Chegutu
Fort Victoria changed to Masvingo
Many places whose names were of European origin in South Africa have undergone Africanization since 1994; see South African Geographical Names Council.
Port Elizabeth changed to Gqeberha in 2021.

Personal names
Joseph-Désiré Mobutu changed to Mobutu Sese Seko
François Tombalbaye changed to N'Garta Tombalbaye
Étienne Eyadéma changed to Gnassingbé Eyadéma
Francisco Macías Nguema changed to Masie Nguema Biyogo Ñegue Ndong
Sometimes, the name change can be used to reflect a change of faith, most prominently seen in the case of Islam. (See Islamic name.)

Examples:
Albert-Bernard Bongo changed to Omar Bongo
Dawda Jawara changed to David Jawara in 1953
Jean-Bédel Bokassa changed to Salah Eddine Ahmed Bokassa

Africanization of civil services

In some countries after following their independence, "Africanization" was the name given to racial policies and affirmative action, which were intended to increase the number of indigenous Africans in the civil service.

Localization in African languages

The term Africanization, abbreviated as the numeronym "A12n," has been applied to discussion of internationalization and localization of software and content in African languages.

See also 
List of placename renaming in South Africa
List of city name changes
List of renamed places in Namibia
List of placename renaming in Zimbabwe
Former place names in the Democratic Republic of the Congo

References

African culture
Decolonization
Cultural assimilation
Geographical naming disputes
Names of places in Africa
Anti-Western sentiment
Pan-Africanism
Human names